Byron Cogdell Rhome (January 11, 1906 – April 24, 1992) was an American football, basketball, and track coach and college athletics administrator. He served as the head football coach at Texas Wesleyan College—now known as Texas Wesleyan University—in Fort Worth, Texas from 1935 to 1936, compiling a record of 11–8–2. Rhome was also the head basketball coach at Texas Wesleyan for two season, from 1935 to 1937, tallying a mark of 14–24.

Rhome attended Cleburne High School in Cleburne, Texas, where he played football for the Cleburne Yellow Jackets. He moved on to Trinity University in Waxahachie, Texas, played football as an end for four seasons. He and also played basketball for four season and baseball for one. After graduating from Trinity in 1929, Rhome was appointed head football coach at Graham High School in Graham, Texas. In 1931, he was named football and track coach at Weatherford Junior College—now known as Weatherford College—in Weatherford, Texas.

Rhome was hired in 1935 as the athletic director at Texas Wesleyan College—now known as Texas Wesleyan University in Fort Worth, Texas and was charged with coaching football, basketball, and track. He led his Texas Wesleyan Rams football teams to records of 8–2–1 in 1935 and 3–6–1 in 1936. Rhome left Texas Wesleyan in 1937 to become head basketball coach at Sunset High School in Dallas. He was succeeded as Texas Wesleyan's head coach in football, basketball, and track by Gus Miller.

Rhome's son, Jerry Rhome, played football for him at Sunset and went on to play college football at the University of Tulsa and professionally in the National Football League (NFL) and Canadian Football League (CFL).

Head coaching record

College football

References

1906 births
1992 deaths
American football ends
American men's basketball coaches
Texas Wesleyan Rams athletic directors
Texas Wesleyan Rams football coaches
Texas Wesleyan Rams men's basketball coaches
Trinity Tigers baseball players
Trinity Tigers football players
Trinity Tigers men's basketball players
College track and field coaches in the United States
High school basketball coaches in Texas
High school football coaches in Texas
Junior college football coaches in the United States
People from Bosque County, Texas
People from Cleburne, Texas
Coaches of American football from Texas
Players of American football from Texas
Baseball players from Texas
Basketball coaches from Texas
Basketball players from Texas